Élie Ehua (born 16 January 1992) is a French professional footballer who plays as a midfielder for Championnat National 2 club Angoulême, of which he is the captain.

Career
Ehua made his professional debut for Châteauroux on 20 May 2011, coming on as a substitute for Gauthier Pinaud in the 1–0 win over Sedan.

In June 2019, Ehua joined Granville. In 2021, he became Angoulême's first signing of the summer transfer window, returning to his former club after a twelve-year absence. He was made club captain.

References

External links 
Elie Ehua profile at foot-national.com

1992 births
Living people
People from Saint-Cyr-l'École
Footballers from Yvelines
French footballers
French sportspeople of Ivorian descent
Association football midfielders
Angoulême Charente FC players
LB Châteauroux players
Vendée Fontenay Foot players
SO Romorantin players
US Granville players
Ligue 2 players
Championnat National 3 players
Championnat National 2 players